William Edward Crystal (born March 14, 1948) is an American actor, comedian, and filmmaker. He gained prominence in the 1970s and 1980s for television roles as Jodie Dallas on the ABC sitcom Soap and as a cast member and frequent host of Saturday Night Live. Crystal then became a Hollywood film star during the late 1980s and 1990s, appearing in Running Scared (1986), The Princess Bride (1987), Throw Momma from the Train (1987), Memories of Me (1988), When Harry Met Sally... (1989), City Slickers (1991), Mr. Saturday Night (1992), Hamlet (1996), Analyze This (1999), and Parental Guidance (2012). He provided the voice of Mike Wazowski in the Monsters, Inc. franchise. He also starred on the Broadway stage in 700 Sundays in 2004 and again in 2014 and in Mr. Saturday Night in 2022.

Crystal has received numerous accolades, including six Primetime Emmy Awards (out of 21 nominations), a Tony Award, a Mark Twain Prize for American Humor, and a star on the Hollywood Walk of Fame in 1991. He has hosted the Academy Awards nine times, beginning in 1990 and most recently in 2012. In 2022, he was announced as the recipient of the Lifetime Achievement Award from the Critics Choice Awards.

Early life 

Crystal was born at Doctors Hospital on the Upper East Side of Manhattan, and initially raised in the Bronx. As a toddler, he moved with his family to 549 East Park Avenue in Long Beach, New York, on Long Island. He and his older brothers Joel, who later became an art teacher, and Richard, nicknamed Rip, were the sons of Helen (née Gabler), a housewife, and Jack Crystal, who owned and operated the Commodore Music Store, founded by Crystal's grandfather, Julius Gabler. Crystal's father was also a jazz promoter, a producer, and an executive for an affiliated jazz record label, Commodore Records, founded by Crystal's uncle, musician and songwriter Milt Gabler. Crystal is Jewish (his family emigrated from Austria, Russia, and Lithuania), and he grew up attending Temple Emanu-El (Long Beach, New York) where he had his bar mitzvah. The three young brothers would entertain by reprising comedy routines from the likes of Bob Newhart, Rich Little and Sid Caesar records their father would bring home. Jazz artists such as Arvell Shaw, Pee Wee Russell, Eddie Condon, and Billie Holiday were often guests in the home. With the decline of Dixieland jazz and the rise of discount record stores, in 1963, Crystal's father lost his business and died later that year at the age of 54 after having a heart attack. His mother died in 2001.

After graduating from Long Beach High School in 1965, Crystal attended Marshall University in Huntington, West Virginia, on a baseball scholarship, having learned the game from his father, who pitched for St. John's University. Crystal never played baseball at Marshall because the program was suspended during his first year.  He did not return to Marshall as a sophomore, instead deciding to stay in New York to be close to his future wife. He studied acting at HB Studio. He attended Nassau Community College with her and later transferred to New York University, where he was a film and television directing major. He graduated from NYU in 1970 with a BFA from its then School of Fine Arts. One of his instructors was Martin Scorsese, while Oliver Stone and Christopher Guest were among his classmates.

Career

Television 

Crystal returned to New York City. For four years, he was part of a comedy trio with two friends. They played colleges and coffee houses and Crystal worked as a substitute teacher on Long Island. He later became a solo act and performed regularly at The Improv and Catch a Rising Star. In 1976, Crystal appeared on an episode of All in the Family. He was on the dais for The Dean Martin Celebrity Roast of Muhammad Ali on February 19, 1976, where he did impressions of both Ali and sportscaster Howard Cosell. He was scheduled to appear on the first episode of NBC Saturday Night on October 11, 1975 (The show was later renamed Saturday Night Live on March 26, 1977), but his sketch was cut. He did perform on episode 17 of that first season, doing a monologue of an old jazz man capped by the line "Can you dig it? I knew that you could." Host Ron Nessen introduced him as "Bill Crystal".  Crystal also made game show appearances such as The Hollywood Squares, All Star Secrets and The $20,000 Pyramid. To this day, he holds the Pyramid franchise's record for getting his contestant partner to the top of the pyramid in the winner's circle in the fastest time: 26 seconds.

Crystal's earliest prominent role was as Jodie Dallas on Soap, one of the first unambiguously gay characters in the cast of an American television series. He continued in the role during the series's entire 1977–1981 run.

In 1982, Billy Crystal hosted his own variety show, The Billy Crystal Comedy Hour on NBC. When Crystal arrived to shoot the fifth episode, he learned it had been canceled after only the first two aired. After hosting Saturday Night Live twice, on March 17, 1984, and the show's ninth season finale on May 5, he joined the regular cast for the 1984–85 season. His most famous recurring sketch was his parody of Fernando Lamas, a smarmy talk-show host whose catchphrase, "You look... mahvelous!", became a media sensation. Also in the 1980s, Crystal starred in an episode of Shelley Duvall's Faerie Tale Theatre as the smartest of the three little pigs.

Crystal was a guest on the first and the last episode of The Tonight Show with Jay Leno, which concluded February 6, 2014, after 22 seasons on the air.

In 1996, Crystal was the guest star of the third episode of Muppets Tonight and hosted three Grammy Awards Telecasts: the 29th Grammys; the 30th Grammys; and the 31st Grammys.

In 2015, Crystal co-starred alongside Josh Gad on the FX comedy series The Comedians, which ran for just one season before being canceled.

Film career 

Crystal's first film role was in Joan Rivers' 1978 film Rabbit Test, the story of the "world's first pregnant man."

Crystal appeared briefly in the Rob Reiner "rockumentary" This Is Spinal Tap (1984) as Morty The Mime, a waiter dressed as a mime at one of Spinal Tap's parties. He shared the scene with a then-unknown, non-speaking Dana Carvey, stating famously that "Mime is money." He later starred in the action comedy Running Scared (1986) and was directed by Reiner again in The Princess Bride (1987), in a comedic supporting role as "Miracle Max". Reiner got Crystal to accept the part by saying, "How would you like to play Mel Brooks?" Reiner also allowed Crystal to ad-lib, and his parting shot, "Have fun storming the castle!" is a frequently quoted line.

Reiner directed Crystal for a third time in the romantic comedy When Harry Met Sally... (1989), in which Crystal starred alongside Meg Ryan and for which he was nominated for a Golden Globe. The film has since become an iconic classic for the genre and is Crystal's most celebrated film. Crystal then starred in the award-winning buddy comedy City Slickers (1991), which proved very successful both commercially and critically and for which Crystal was nominated for his second Golden Globe. The film was followed by a sequel, which was less successful. In 1992, he narrated Dr. Seuss Video Classics: Horton Hatches the Egg. The name of his company is Face Productions.

Following the significant success of these films, Crystal wrote, directed, and starred in Mr. Saturday Night (1992) and Forget Paris (1995). In the former, Crystal played a serious role in aging makeup, as an egotistical comedian who reflects back on his career. Crystal starred in Woody Allen's critically acclaimed comedy ensemble film Deconstructing Harry (1997). Crystal had another success alongside Robert De Niro in Harold Ramis' mobster comedy Analyze This (1999). More recent performances include roles in America's Sweethearts (2001), the sequel Analyze That (2002), and Parental Guidance (2012).

He directed the made-for-television movie 61* (2001) based on Roger Maris's and Mickey Mantle's race to break Babe Ruth's single-season home run record in 1961. This earned Crystal an Emmy nomination for Outstanding Directing for a Miniseries, Movie or a Special.

Crystal was originally asked to voice Buzz Lightyear in Toy Story (1995) but turned it down, a decision he later regretted due to the popularity of the series. Crystal later went on to provide the voice of Mike Wazowski in the blockbuster Pixar film Monsters, Inc. (2001), Cars (2006), during the epilogue in the end credits, and to reprise his voice role in the prequel, Monsters University (2013). Crystal also provided the voice of Calcifer in the English version of Hayao Miyazaki's Howl's Moving Castle (2004).

Albums and music career 

Due to the success of Crystal's standup and SNL career, in 1985, he released an album of his stand-up material titled Mahvelous!.  The title track You Look Marvelous, written by Crystal and Paul Shaffer, had an accompanying music video that debuted on MTV. Both the song and video features Crystal in character as his SNL persona of talk show host Fernando Lamas. The video features Lamas cruising around in what was at the time the world's longest stretch limousine, built by custom-coach designer and builder Vini Bergeman, surrounded by models in bikinis. The single peaked at No. 58 on the Billboard Hot 100 in the US, and No. 17 in Canada. The album was nominated for a Grammy Award for Best Comedy Recording at the 1986 Grammy Awards.

In 2013, Crystal released his autobiographical memoir Still Foolin' Em. The audiobook version was nominated for a Grammy Award for Best Spoken Word Album at the 2014 Grammy Awards.

Academy Awards host 
Crystal hosted the Academy Awards broadcast a total of 9 times, from 1990 to 1993, 1997, 1998, 2000, 2004 and 2012. His hosting was critically praised, resulting in two Primetime Emmy Award wins for hosting and writing the 63rd Academy Awards and an Emmy win for writing the 64th Academy Awards. He returned as the host for the 2012 Oscar ceremony, after Eddie Murphy resigned from hosting. His nine times is second only to Bob Hope's 19 in most ceremonies hosted. At the 83rd Academy Awards ceremony in 2011, he appeared as a presenter for a digitally inserted Bob Hope and before doing so was given a standing ovation. Film critic Roger Ebert said when Crystal came onstage about two hours into the show, he got the first laughs of the broadcast. Crystal's hosting gigs have regularly included an introductory video segment in which he comedically inserts himself into scenes of that year's nominees in addition to a song following his opening monologue.

Broadway 
Crystal won the 2005 Tony Award for Best Special Theatrical Event for 700 Sundays, a two-act, one-man play, which he conceived and wrote about his parents and his childhood growing up on Long Island. He toured throughout the US with the show in 2006 and then Australia in 2007.

Following the initial success of the play, Crystal wrote the book 700 Sundays for Warner Books, which was published on October 31, 2005. In conjunction with the book and the play that also paid tribute to his uncle, Milt Gabler, Crystal produced two CD compilations: Billy Crystal Presents: The Milt Gabler Story, which featured his uncle's most influential recordings from Billie Holiday's "Strange Fruit" to "Rock Around the Clock" by Bill Haley & His Comets; and Billy Remembers Billie featuring Crystal's favorite Holiday recordings.

In the fall of 2013, he brought the show back to Broadway for a two-month run at the Imperial Theatre. HBO filmed the January 3–4, 2014 performances for a special, which debuted on their network on April 19, 2014 entitled Billy Crystal: 700 Sundays. The televised special received three Primetime Emmy Award nominations including Outstanding Variety Special, and Outstanding Writing for a Variety Special.

In 2022, Crystal adapted his 1992 movie Mr. Saturday Night into a Broadway musical with the same name. Crystal stars in the musical reprising his role from the film alongside David Paymer. The production began previews on Broadway at the Nederlander Theatre on March 29, 2022, prior to officially opening on April 27. Crystal earned the Drama League Award for Contribution to the Theater Award for "his extraordinary work on stages across the country and commitment to mentorship in the field". Crystal performed a number with the ensemble from his musical at the 75th Tony Awards. He also performed what he described as Yiddish scat singing. He went into the crowd teaching Lin-Manuel Miranda and Samuel L. Jackson as well as the rest of the audience. The New York Times praised Crystal on his bit, describing it as a highlight of the telecast writing, "one of the few moments that broke through...is when [Crystal] brought it out into the audience, and threw it up to the balcony, he showed how precision delivery and command of a room can make even the oldest, silliest material impossibly compelling."

Other appearances 
In 2014, Crystal paid tribute to his close friend Robin Williams at the 66th Primetime Emmy Awards. In his tribute he talked about their friendship, saying, "As genius as he was on stage, he was the greatest friend you could ever imagine. Supportive. Protective. Loving. It's very hard to talk about him in the past because he was so present in all of our lives. For almost 40 years, he was the brightest star in the comedy galaxy…[His] beautiful light will continue to shine on us forever. And the glow will be so bright, it'll warm your heart. It'll make your eyes glisten. And you'll think to yourselves: Robin Williams. What a concept." Crystal stated that paying tribute to Williams so publicly and so soon after Williams had died was one of "the hardest things I've had to do" and that "I was really worried that I wasn't going to get through it." Crystal soon after appeared on The View where he and Whoopi Goldberg shared stories about Williams, reminiscing about their friendship, and their collaborations together on Comic Relief.

In 2016, Crystal gave one of the eulogies for Muhammad Ali at his funeral. In his remembrance of Ali, Crystal talked about his admiration for Ali as a boxer, and humanitarian. He also shared stories of their unlikely friendship after Crystal did a series of impersonations of him. Crystal stated of Ali's legacy, "Only once in a thousand years or so, do we get to hear a Mozart, or see a Picasso, or read a Shakespeare. Ali was one of them. And yet, at his heart, he was still a kid from Louisville who ran with the gods and walked with the crippled and smiled at the foolishness of it all."

In the fall of 2021, Crystal reprised the role of Buddy Young Jr., in a theatrical musical staging of Mr. Saturday Night at the Barrington Stage Company in Pittsfield, MA.

Discography

Albums
Mahvelous!, (A&M Records, 1985) [#65 US]

Singles
"You Look Marvelous", (A&M Records, 1985) [#58 US]
"I Hate When That Happens", (A&M Records, 1985)
"The Christmas Song", (A&M Records, 1985)

Bibliography

Awards and nominations

Personal life 
On June 4, 1970, Crystal married his high school sweetheart, Janice Goldfinger. Crystal has long credited his parents, "who always looked like they loved being together," with setting an example for his own marriage. They have two daughters: actress Jennifer and Lindsay, a producer, and are grandparents. They live in the Pacific Palisades  neighborhood of Los Angeles, California.

Crystal received an honorary Doctor of Fine Arts degree from New York University in 2016 and spoke at the commencement at Yankee Stadium.

Philanthropy 

In 1986, Crystal started hosting Comic Relief on HBO with Robin Williams and Whoopi Goldberg. Founded by Bob Zmuda, Comic Relief raises money for homeless people in the United States.

On September 6, 2005, on The Tonight Show with Jay Leno, Crystal and Jay Leno were the first celebrities to sign a Harley-Davidson motorcycle to be auctioned off for Gulf Coast relief.

Crystal has participated in the Simon Wiesenthal Center Museum of Tolerance in Los Angeles. Crystal's personal history is featured in the "Finding Our Families, Finding Ourselves" exhibit in the genealogy wing of the museum.

Sports 
On March 12, 2008, Crystal signed a one-day minor league contract to play with the New York Yankees, and was invited to the team's major league spring training. He wore uniform number 60 in honor of his upcoming 60th birthday. On March 13, in a spring training game against the Pittsburgh Pirates, Crystal led off as the designated hitter. He managed to make contact, fouling a fastball up the first base line, but was eventually struck out by Pirates pitcher Paul Maholm on six pitches and was later replaced in the batting order by Johnny Damon. He was released on March 14, his 60th birthday.

Crystal's boyhood idol was Yankee Hall of Fame legend Mickey Mantle, who had signed a program for him when Crystal attended a game where Mantle had hit a home run. Years later on The Dinah Shore Show, in one of his first television appearances, Crystal met Mantle in person and had Mantle re-sign the same program. Crystal would be good friends with Mantle until Mantle's death in 1995. He and Bob Costas together wrote the eulogy Costas read at Mantle's funeral, and George Steinbrenner then invited Crystal to emcee the unveiling of Mantle's monument at Yankee Stadium. In his 2013 memoir Still Foolin' 'Em, Crystal claimed that after the ceremony, near the Yankees clubhouse, he was punched in the stomach by Joe DiMaggio, who was angry at Crystal for not having introduced him to the crowd as the "Greatest living player".

Crystal also was well known for his impressions of Yankees Hall of Famer turned broadcaster Phil Rizzuto. Rizzuto, known for his quirks calling games, did not travel to Anaheim, California in 1996 to call the game for WPIX. Instead, Crystal joined the broadcasters in the booth and pretended to be Rizzuto for a few minutes during the August 31 game.

Although a lifelong Yankees fan, he is a part-owner of the Arizona Diamondbacks, even earning a World Series ring in 2001 when the Diamondbacks beat his beloved Yankees.

In City Slickers, Crystal wore a New York Mets baseball cap. In the 1986 film Running Scared, his character is an avid Chicago Cubs fan, wearing a Cubs' jersey in several scenes. In the 2012 film Parental Guidance, his character is the announcer for the Fresno Grizzlies, a Minor League Baseball team, who aspires to announce for their Major League affiliate, the San Francisco Giants.

Crystal appeared in Ken Burns's 1994 documentary Baseball, telling personal stories about his life-long love of baseball, including meeting Casey Stengel as a child and Ted Williams as an adult.

Crystal is also a longtime Los Angeles Clippers fan and season ticket holder.

References

External links 

 
Website for Billy Crystal's book Still Foolin' 'Em 
 

 
1948 births
Age controversies
Living people
20th-century American male actors
21st-century American male actors
American comedy musicians
American film producers
American impressionists (entertainers)
American male comedians
American male film actors
American male musical theatre actors
American male screenwriters
American male singers
American male stage actors
American male television actors
American male television writers
American male voice actors
American people of Austrian-Jewish descent
American people of Lithuanian-Jewish descent
American people of Russian-Jewish descent
American sketch comedians
American stand-up comedians
American television directors
American television writers
Long Beach High School (New York) alumni
Television producers from New York (state)
Audiobook narrators
Arizona Diamondbacks owners
Comedians from New York (state)
Jewish American male comedians
Jewish American male actors
Jewish American writers
Mark Twain Prize recipients
Marshall Thundering Herd baseball players
Marshall University alumni
Nassau Community College alumni
People from Long Beach, New York
Primetime Emmy Award winners
Tisch School of the Arts alumni
Tony Award winners
Film directors from New York (state)
Screenwriters from New York (state)
People from Pacific Palisades, California